Ko Olina Beach Park  is a public park on the west side of the island of Oahu, Hawaii within the Ko Olina Resort Community, part of the City and County of Honolulu. Located at the end of several high-end vacation resorts, the park is situated between the man made lagoon and the Ko Olina Marina. 
The park's white-sand lagoon is one of four in the 640-acre Ko Olina Resort. The water is well protected by the reef, relatively shallow and the beach bordered by a broad, grassy lawn.

See also
List of beaches in Oahu

References

Beaches of Oahu
Parks in Hawaii
Protected areas of Oahu